Baron Inchyra, of St Madoes in the County of Perth, is a title in the Peerage of the United Kingdom. It was created on 2 February 1962 for the diplomat Sir Frederick Millar, who had previously served as British Ambassador to West Germany. , the title is held by his grandson, the third Baron, who succeeded in 2011.

The family seat is Inchyra House, near Glencarse, Perth.

Barons Inchyra (1962)
Frederick Robert Hoyer Millar, 1st Baron Inchyra (1900–1989)
Robert Charles Reneke Hoyer Millar, 2nd Baron Inchyra (1935–2011)
(Christian) James Charles Hoyer Millar, 3rd Baron Inchyra (b. 1962)

The heir apparent is the present holder's only son, Hon. Jake Christian Robert Hoyer Millar (b. 1996).

Line of succession

  Frederick Hoyer Millar, 1st Baron Inchyra (1900–1989)
  Robert Charles Reneke Hoyer Millar, 2nd Baron Inchyra (1935–2011)
  (Christian) James Charles Hoyer Millar, 3rd Baron Inchyra (born 1962)
 (1) Hon. Jake Christian Robert Hoyer Millar (b. 1996)
 (2) Hon. Alastair James Harold Hoyer Millar (b. 1936)
 (3) Mark Cristian Frederick Hoyer Millar (b. 1975)

Arms

Notes

References
Kidd, Charles & Williamson, David (editors). Debrett's Peerage and Baronetage (1990 edition). New York: St Martin's Press, 1990, 

Baronies in the Peerage of the United Kingdom
Noble titles created in 1962